Rodney Jerome Brown, Jr. (born September 24, 1984), known professionally as RJMrLA (or simply RJ) is a rapper from Los Angeles, California. He is known for his frequent collaborations with fellow West Coast artists YG and Mustard, and was signed to their labels: 4Hunnid and 10 Summers Records respectively. His most celebrated releases to date are his O.M.M.I.O. mixtape trilogy.

Musical career

2013–present: O.M.M.I.O. series and collaborations 
In 2013, RJ released his debut mixtape O.M.M.I.O (which stands for On My Mama I'm On). The mixtape was hosted and largely produced by DJ Mustard. The first song from this mixtape, "Ride Wit Me" was included and released, as the single. RJ then appeared on the songs; Thank God (Interlude) and When I Was Gone from YG's debut album, My Krazy Life (2014). In July 2014, RJ released his second mixtape, featuring local rappers; Shoota300, JaywhiteT, Vince Staples and more. Takin Niggas Beats (on a contrary to his first mixtape). Unfortunately disagreements between them erupted, which led to RJ dropping their names from the project entirely. The beats on this mixtape were solely from made-up beats from the other rappers that were remixed by RJ. On the same year, DJ Mustard released his debut album 10 Summers, where RJ appeared on these tracks; including Low Low, Throw Your Hood Up and No Reason. At the beginning of 2015, RJ collaborated with Choice to release a critically acclaimed mixtape, Rich Off Mackin. Additionally, RJ appeared on the DJ Mustard's mixtape, titled Ketchup, as well as one of YG's mixtapes Just Re'd Up 2. On May 26, 2015, RJ released a mixtape, "O.M.M.I.O. 2", as the sequel to his debut mixtape "O.M.M.I.O". The song "Get Rich" was included and released, as the single. Both of these singles; his 2013's single, "Ride Wit Me" and his 2015's single, "Get Rich", did not chart, both songs received radio airplay throughout the West Coast. He also contributed to the soundtrack for the NBA 2K16 video game by being featured in the original song "You Don't Want It" with frequent collaborator and 10 Summers Records founder DJ Mustard.
On May 12, 2016, he released O.M.M.I.O 3 it has 19 tracks including a bonus track "Feda" that's only on SoundCloud. RJ also released TNB 2 (Takin Niggas Beats) on October 11, 2016. On December 15, 2017, RJ & DJ Mustard released a collaboration named "The Ghetto"

Discography

Albums

Mixtapes

Guest appearances

References

https://www.hotnewhiphop.com/rj/profile/

Tharpe, Frazier
(June 7, 2019)
https://www.complex.com/music/2019/06/rjmrla-apartment-empire-signing Retrieved on 2019-06-12

Living people
African-American male rappers
Gangsta rappers
Rappers from Los Angeles
West Coast hip hop musicians
21st-century American rappers
1984 births
21st-century American male musicians
21st-century African-American musicians
20th-century African-American people